The Marihuana Story is a 1950 Argentine film directed by León Klimovsky. It was entered into the 1951 Cannes Film Festival.

Cast

 Pedro López Lagar – Dr. Pablo Urioste
 Fanny Navarro – Marga Quiroga
 Golde Flami – Aída
 Nathán Pinzón – Sopita
 Eduardo Cuitiño – Gang Boss
 Alberto de Mendoza – Lt. DeLuca
 Gilberto Peyret – Inspector Olivera
 Roberto Durán – Diego
 Héctor Quintanilla – Chevrolet
 Pilar Gómez – Amelia
 Angel Prio
 Cecilia Ingenieros
 Elsa Márquez
 Juan Carrara
 Jesús Pampín – Hombre en congreso
 Alberto Rinaldi
 Alberto Barcel – Dr, Piñeyro
 Warly Ceriani – Director
 Mauricio Espósito
 Leticia Lando
 Gloria Castilla
 Domingo Mania – Dr. Portal
 Juan Fava
 Adolfo Laurie
 China Navarro
 Osvaldo Cabrera
 Rafael Diserio – Dueno de boite
 Jorge Villoldo – Portero
 Alfredo Almanza

Production
The relative financial success of the American exploitation film She Shoulda Said 'No'! (1949), a morality tale involving the use of marijuana, prompted producers in 1951 to import The Marihuana Story from Argentina.

See also
 Cannabis in Argentina

References

External links 

1950 films
1950 in cannabis
1950 drama films
Argentine black-and-white films
Argentine films about cannabis
Anti-cannabis media
Films directed by León Klimovsky
1950s Spanish-language films
Argentine drama films
1950s Argentine films